Hakea eriantha, commonly known as  tree hakea, is a shrub or small tree endemic to the east coast of Australia. It has white flowers on a woolly stem in leaf axils, long narrow leaves with reddish new growth. Found growing at higher altitudes in moist or sclerophyll Eucalyptus woodland.

Description
Leaves are linear to egg-shaped  and 8 to 18.5 cm long and 1 to 30 mm wide. It is wrinkled and has beak that is about 3 mm long.

Taxonomy and naming
Hakea eriantha was first formally described in 1830 by botanist Robert Brown from a specimen collected near the Hastings River by Charles Fraser. The description was published in an addendum to the Supplementum primum Prodromi florae Novae Hollandiae. The specific epithet (eriantha) is derived from the Ancient Greek words erion meaning "wool" and anthos meaning "flower" referring to the hairy flowers of this hakea.

Distribution and habitat
Tree hakea occurs in Eucalyptus woodland or forest and the edge of rainforest from Gladstone in Queensland, southward to Gippsland in Victoria.

Use in horticulture
Hakea eriantha is a fast growing species, suitable for wet cold climates as a screening or hedging plant. A food source for the gang-gang cockatoo (Calocephalon fimbriatum) as they share a similar habitat. Also preferred in some districts by the yellow-tailed black cockatoo (Calyptorhynchus funereus) as a food source.

References

eriantha
Flora of New South Wales
Flora of Queensland
Flora of Victoria (Australia)
Plants described in 1830